KBSR (1490 AM) was a radio station licensed to Laurel, Montana, United States. The station served the Billings, Montana, area.

History
The station was assigned the call letters KBSO on July 10, 1987. On June 17, 1989, the station changed its call sign to KFBN, then again on September 3, 1990 to KBSR.
Due to the loss of its tower, the station used a special temporary authority to broadcast 0.02 kW from an alternate site near Laurel. The antenna would be a "half wavelength" long wire antenna attached to the existing facilities.

On November 29, 2018, KBSR was taken off the air and its license was deleted by the FCC because it had no tower and was broadcasting illegally for years, along with sister station KYLW.

References

External link
FCC Station Search Details: DKBSR (Facility ID: 5297)

BSR
Radio stations established in 1980
1980 establishments in Montana
Defunct radio stations in the United States
Radio stations disestablished in 2018
2018 disestablishments in Montana
BSR